The usage of a language is the ways in which its written and spoken variations are routinely employed by its speakers; that is, it refers to "the collective habits of a language's native speakers", as opposed to idealized models of how a language works or (should work) in the abstract. For instance, Fowler characterized usage as "the way in which a word or phrase is normally and correctly used" and as the "points of grammar, syntax, style, and the choice of words."

In the descriptive tradition of language analysis, by way of contrast, "correct" tends to mean functionally adequate for the purposes of the speaker or writer using it, and adequately idiomatic to be accepted by the listener or reader; usage is also, however, a concern for the prescriptive tradition, for which "correctness" is a matter of arbitrating style.

Common usage may be used as one of the criteria of laying out prescriptive norms for codified standard language usage. 

Modern dictionaries are not generally prescriptive, but they often include "usage notes" which may describe words as "formal", "informal", "slang", and so on. "Despite occasional usage notes, lexicographers generally disclaim any intent to guide writers and editors on the thorny points of English usage."

History
According to Jeremy Butterfield, "The first person we know of who made usage refer to language was Daniel Defoe, at the end of the seventeenth century". Defoe proposed the creation of a language society of 36 individuals who would set prescriptive language rules for the approximately six million English speakers.

The Latin equivalent usus was a crucial term in the research of Danish linguists Otto Jespersen and Louis Hjelmslev. They used the term to designate usage that has widespread or significant acceptance among speakers of a language, regardless of its conformity to the sanctioned standard language norms.

See also
Error (linguistics)
English writing style
Common English usage misconceptions
List of English words with disputed usage

References 
 
 

Sociolinguistics
Applied linguistics
Grammar
Language varieties and styles